The men's tournament in ice hockey at the 2022 Winter Olympics took place in Beijing, China between 9 and 20 February 2022. Twelve countries qualified for the tournament; eight of them did so automatically by virtue of their ranking by the International Ice Hockey Federation, one, China, automatically qualified as hosts, while the three others took part in a qualification tournament.

The Olympic Athletes from Russia team won in 2018. The Russian Olympic Committee, representing Russia at the 2022 Games, were the defending champions.

For the first time in history, the Czech Republic did not qualify for the quarter-finals and finished in ninth place, their lowest placement in history.

Finland won their first ever ice hockey Olympic gold medal after going undefeated and beating the Russian Olympic Committee in the final.

Slovakia claimed their first ever ice hockey medal at the Olympics after defeating Sweden 4–0 and finishing third.

Venues

Qualified teams

Format
The twelve teams were split into three groups of four teams each, in which they will play against each team once. The top team of each group and the best second-ranked team will advance to the quarterfinals, while all other teams play a qualification round. A knockout system will be used after the group stage.

Rosters

Due to the lack of ice hockey talent in China, players had to be recruited from abroad. The men's hockey team is composed of eleven Canadians, nine Chinese, three Americans, and a Russian. Neither the Chinese Olympic Committee, International Ice Hockey Federation nor the IOC commented on how it was possible for foreign players to compete for China, as the Olympic Charter requires competitors to be citizens of the country they represent. According to the nationality law of China, anyone who were naturalized as Chinese citizens, or those who resumed their Chinese nationality, must renounce all the other nationalities, as China does not recognize dual-nationality. The IOC Executive Board has the authority to make certain exceptions of a "general or individual nature", though it is unclear whether this was the case. When asked whether he had naturalized as a Chinese citizen, athlete Jake Chelios refused to comment, though he confirmed that he still has his American passport.

NHL participation 
On 10 July 2020, the National Hockey League Players' Association (NHLPA) and National Hockey League agreed to a renewed collective bargaining agreement, which includes a provision opening the possibility for the NHL to explore participation at the 2022 and 2026 Winter Olympics. On 22 July 2021, the NHL released a 2021–22 schedule that included an Olympic break, but the league also announced that a final agreement had not yet been reached regarding Olympic participation of NHL players in 2022. On 3 September 2021, an agreement was made to allow NHL players to compete. In December 2021, many NHL players started contracting COVID-19 and several teams temporarily suspended operations while their players were in quarantine. This forced the NHL to postpone some regular season games and due to the rise in cases of COVID-19 worldwide; on 22 December 2021, the NHL announced that NHL players would not be released for participation in the Olympics.

Match officials
15 referees and 12 linesmen were selected for the tournament.

Referees
 Maxim Sidorenko
 Michael Campbell
 Oliver Gouin
 Martin Fraňo
 Mikko Kaukokari
 Kristian Vikman
 André Schrader
 Andris Ansons
 Roman Gofman
 Evgenii Romasko
 Tobias Björk
 Mikael Nord
 Michael Tscherrig
 Andrew Bruggeman
 Stephen Reneau

Linesmen
 Dustin McCrank
 Daniel Hynek
 Jiří Ondráček
 Lauri Nikulainen
 Gleb Lazarev
 Nikita Shalagin
 Dmitry Shishlo
 Ludvig Lundgren
 Andreas Malmqvist
 David Obwegeser
 William Hancock
 Brian Oliver

Preliminary round
All times are local (UTC+8).

Tiebreak criteria
In each group, teams ranked according to the following criteria:
Number of points (three points for a regulation-time win, two points for an overtime or shootout win, one point for an overtime or shootout defeat, no points for a regulation-time defeat);
In case two teams are tied on points, the result of their head-to-head match will determine the ranking;
In case three or four teams are tied on points, the following criteria will apply (if, after applying a criterion, only two teams remain tied, the result of their head-to-head match will determine their ranking):
Points obtained in head-to-head matches between the teams concerned;
Goal differential in head-to-head matches between the teams concerned;
Number of goals scored in head-to-head matches between the teams concerned;
If three teams remain tied, result of head-to-head matches between each of the teams concerned and the remaining team in the group (points, goal difference, goals scored);
Place in 2021 IIHF World Ranking.

Group A

Group B

Group C

Ranking after preliminary round
Following the completion of the preliminary round, all teams were ranked 1D through 12D. The semifinals were then reseeded according to this ranking. To determine this ranking, the following criteria were used in the order presented:
higher position in the group
higher number of points
better goal difference
higher number of goals scored for
better IIHF World Ranking.

Playoff round

Bracket
Teams were reseeded based on the preliminary round ranking after the quarterfinals.

Playoffs

Quarterfinals

Semifinals

Bronze medal game

Gold medal game

Final ranking
The places five to twelve are ranked by their preliminary round group placement and then points and goal difference.

Statistics

Scoring leaders
The list shows the top ten skaters sorted by points, then goals.

GP = Games played; G = Goals; A = Assists; Pts = Points; +/− = Plus/minus; PIM = Penalties in minutes; POS = Position
Source: IIHF.com

Leading goaltenders
The list shows the top five goaltenders, based on save percentage, who have played at least 40% of their team's minutes.

TOI = Time on ice (minutes:seconds); SA = Shots against; GA = Goals against; GAA = Goals against average; Sv% = Save percentage; SO = ShutoutsSource: IIHF.com

Awards
The all-star team was announced on 20 February 2022.

References

External links
Ice hockey – men's schedule  at International Olympic Committee
IIHF website